Costa Rica (literally "Rich Coast"), officially the Republic of Costa Rica, is a country in the Central American region of North America, bordered by Nicaragua to the north, the Caribbean Sea to the northeast, Panama to the southeast, the Pacific Ocean to the southwest, and maritime border with Ecuador to the south of Cocos Island. An estimated 333,980 people live in the capital and largest city, San José, with around two million people in the surrounding metropolitan area.

The sovereign state is a unitary presidential constitutional republic. It has a long-standing and stable democracy and a highly educated workforce. The country spends roughly 6.9% of its budget (2016) on education, compared to a global average of 4.4%. Its economy, once heavily dependent on agriculture, has diversified to include sectors such as finance, corporate services for foreign companies, pharmaceuticals, and ecotourism. Many foreign manufacturing and services companies operate in Costa Rica's Free Trade Zones (FTZ) where they benefit from investment and tax incentives.

Costa Rica was inhabited by indigenous peoples before coming under Spanish rule in the 16th century. It remained a peripheral colony of the empire until independence as part of the First Mexican Empire, followed by membership in the Federal Republic of Central America, from which it formally declared independence in 1847. Following the brief Costa Rican Civil War in 1948, it permanently abolished its army in 1949, becoming one of only a few sovereign nations without a standing army.

The country has consistently performed favorably in the Human Development Index (HDI), placing 62nd in the world , and fifth in Latin America. It has also been cited by the United Nations Development Programme (UNDP) as having attained much higher human development than other countries at the same income levels, with a better record on human development and inequality than the median of the region. It also performs well in comparisons of the state of democracy, press freedom and subjective happiness. It has the 7th freest press according to the Press Freedom Index, it is the 37th most democratic country according to the Freedom in the World index and it is the 12th happiest country in the World Happiness Report.

History

Pre-Columbian period 

Historians have classified the indigenous people of Costa Rica as belonging to the Intermediate Area, where the peripheries of the Mesoamerican and Andean native cultures overlapped. More recently, pre-Columbian Costa Rica has also been described as part of the Isthmo-Colombian Area.

Stone tools, the oldest evidence of human occupation in Costa Rica, are associated with the arrival of various groups of hunter-gatherers about 10,000 to 7,000 years BCE in the Turrialba Valley. The presence of Clovis culture type spearheads and arrows from South America opens the possibility that, in this area, two different cultures coexisted.

Agriculture became evident in the populations that lived in Costa Rica about 5,000 years ago. They mainly grew tubers and roots. For the first and second millennia BCE there were already settled farming communities. These were small and scattered, although the timing of the transition from hunting and gathering to agriculture as the main livelihood in the territory is still unknown.

The earliest use of pottery appears around 2,000 to 3,000 BCE. Shards of pots, cylindrical vases, platters, gourds, and other forms of vases decorated with grooves, prints, and some modeled after animals have been found.

The impact of indigenous peoples on modern Costa Rican culture has been relatively small compared to other nations since the country lacked a strong native civilization, to begin with. Most of the native population was absorbed into the Spanish-speaking colonial society through inter-marriage, except for some small remnants, the most significant of which are the Bribri and Boruca tribes who still inhabit the mountains of the Cordillera de Talamanca, in the southeastern part of Costa Rica, near the frontier with Panama.

Spanish colonization 
The name , meaning "rich coast" in the Spanish language, was in some accounts first applied by Christopher Columbus, who sailed to the eastern shores of Costa Rica during his final voyage in 1502, and reported vast quantities of gold jewelry worn by natives. The name may also have come from conquistador Gil González Dávila, who landed on the west coast in 1522, encountered natives, and obtained some of their gold, sometimes by violent theft and sometimes as gifts from local leaders.

During most of the colonial period, Costa Rica was the southernmost province of the Captaincy General of Guatemala, nominally part of the Viceroyalty of New Spain. In practice, the captaincy general was a largely autonomous entity within the Spanish Empire. Costa Rica's distance from the capital of the captaincy in Guatemala, its legal prohibition under mercantilist Spanish law from trade with its southern neighbor Panama, then part of the Viceroyalty of New Granada (i.e. Colombia), and lack of resources such as gold and silver, made Costa Rica into a poor, isolated, and sparsely-inhabited region within the Spanish Empire. Costa Rica was described as "the poorest and most miserable Spanish colony in all America" by a Spanish governor in 1719.

For all these reasons, Costa Rica was, by and large, unappreciated and overlooked by the Spanish Crown and left to develop on its own. The circumstances during this period are believed to have led to many of the idiosyncrasies for which Costa Rica has become known, while concomitantly setting the stage for Costa Rica's development as a more egalitarian society than the rest of its neighbors. Costa Rica became a "rural democracy" with no oppressed mestizo or indigenous class. It was not long before Spanish settlers turned to the hills, where they found rich volcanic soil and a milder climate than that of the lowlands.

Independence 

Like the rest of Central America, Costa Rica never fought for independence from Spain. On 15 September 1821, after the final Spanish defeat in the Mexican War of Independence (1810–1821), the authorities in Guatemala declared the independence of all of Central America. That date is still celebrated as Independence Day in Costa Rica even though, technically, under the Spanish Constitution of 1812 that had been readopted in 1820, Nicaragua and Costa Rica had become an autonomous province with its capital in León.

Upon independence, Costa Rican authorities faced the issue of officially deciding the future of the country. Two bands formed, the Imperialists, defended by Cartago and Heredia cities which were in favor of joining the Mexican Empire, and the Republicans, represented by the cities of San José and Alajuela who defended full independence. Because of the lack of agreement on these two possible outcomes, the first civil war of Costa Rica occurred. The Battle of Ochomogo took place on the Hill of Ochomogo, located in the Central Valley in 1823. The conflict was won by the Republicans and, as a consequence, the city of Cartago lost its status as the capital, which moved to San José.

In 1838, long after the Federal Republic of Central America ceased to function in practice, Costa Rica formally withdrew and proclaimed itself sovereign. The considerable distance and poor communication routes between Guatemala City and the Central Plateau, where most of the Costa Rican population lived then and still lives now, meant the local population had little allegiance to the federal government in Guatemala. Since colonial times, Costa Rica has been reluctant to become economically tied with the rest of Central America. Even today, despite most of its neighbors' efforts to increase regional integration, Costa Rica has remained more independent.

Until 1849, when it became part of Panama, Chiriquí was part of Costa Rica. Costa Rican pride was assuaged for the loss of this eastern (or southern) territory with the acquisition of Guanacaste, in the north.

Economic growth in the 19th century 

Coffee was first planted in Costa Rica in 1808, and by the 1820s, it surpassed tobacco, sugar, and cacao as a primary export. Coffee production remained Costa Rica's principal source of wealth well into the 20th century, creating a wealthy class of growers, the so-called Coffee Barons. The revenue helped to modernize the country.

Most of the coffee exported was grown around the main centers of population in the Central Plateau and then transported by oxcart to the Pacific port of Puntarenas after the main road was built in 1846. By the mid-1850s the main market for coffee was Britain. It soon became a high priority to developing an effective transportation route from the Central Plateau to the Atlantic Ocean. For this purpose, in the 1870s, the Costa Rican government contracted with U.S. businessman Minor C. Keith to build a railroad from San José to the Caribbean port of Limón. Despite enormous difficulties with construction, disease, and financing, the railroad was completed in 1890.

Most Afro-Costa Ricans descend from Jamaican immigrants who worked in the construction of that railway and now make up about 3% of Costa Rica's population.  U.S. convicts, Italians, and Chinese immigrants also participated in the construction project. In exchange for completing the railroad, the Costa Rican government granted Keith large tracts of land and a lease on the train route, which he used to produce bananas and export them to the United States. As a result, bananas came to rival coffee as the principal Costa Rican export, while foreign-owned corporations (including the United Fruit Company later) began to hold a major role in the national economy and eventually became a symbol of the exploitative export economy. The major labor dispute between the peasants and the United Fruit Company (The Great Banana Strike) was a major event in the country's history and was an important step that would eventually lead to the formation of effective trade unions in Costa Rica, as the company was required to sign a collective agreement with its workers in 1938.

20th century 

Historically, Costa Rica has generally enjoyed greater peace and more consistent political stability than many of its fellow Latin American nations. Since the late 19th century, however, Costa Rica has experienced two significant periods of violence. In 1917–1919, General Federico Tinoco Granados ruled as a military dictator until he was overthrown and forced into exile. The unpopularity of Tinoco's regime led, after he was overthrown, to a considerable decline in the size, wealth, and political influence of the Costa Rican military. In 1948, José Figueres Ferrer led an armed uprising in the wake of a disputed presidential election between Rafael Ángel Calderón Guardia (who had been president between 1940 and 1944) and Otilio Ulate Blanco. With more than 2,000 dead, the resulting 44-day Costa Rican Civil War was the bloodiest event in Costa Rica during the 20th century.

The victorious rebels formed a government junta that abolished the military altogether and oversaw the drafting of a new constitution by a democratically elected assembly. Having enacted these reforms, the junta transferred power to Ulate on 8 November 1949. After the coup d'état, Figueres became a national hero, winning the country's first democratic election under the new constitution in 1953. Since then, Costa Rica has held 15 additional presidential elections, the latest in 2022. With uninterrupted democracy dating back to at least 1948, the country is the region's most stable.

Geography 

Costa Rica borders the Caribbean Sea to the east, and the Pacific Ocean to the west. Costa Rica also borders Nicaragua to the north and Panama to the south.

The highest volcano in the country is the Irazú Volcano and the largest lake is Lake Arenal. There are 14 known volcanoes in Costa Rica, and six of them have been active in the last 75 years.

Climate 
Costa Rica experiences a tropical climate year-round. There are two seasons. The dry season is December to April, and the rainy season is May to November.

Flora and fauna 

There is a rich variety of plants and Costa Rican wildlife.

One national park, the Corcovado National Park, is internationally renowned among ecologists for its biodiversity (including big cats and tapirs) and is where visitors can expect to see an abundance of wildlife. Corcovado is the one park in Costa Rica where all four Costa Rican monkey species can be found. These include the white-headed capuchin, the mantled howler, the endangered Geoffroy's spider monkey, and the Central American squirrel monkey, found only on the Pacific coast of Costa Rica and a small part of Panama, and considered endangered until 2008, when its status was upgraded to vulnerable. Deforestation, illegal pet-trading, and hunting are the main reasons for its threatened status. Costa Rica is the first tropical country to have stopped and reversed deforestation; it has successfully restored its forestry and developed an ecosystem service to teach biologists and ecologists about its environmental protection measures. The country had a 2018 Forest Landscape Integrity Index mean score of 4.65/10, ranking it 118th globally out of 172 countries.

Economy 

The country has been considered economically stable with moderate inflation, estimated at 2.6% in 2017, and moderately high growth in GDP, which increased from US$41.3 billion in 2011 to US$52.6 billion in 2015. The estimated GDP for 2018 is US$59.0 billion and the estimated GDP per capita (purchasing power parity) is Intl$17,559.1. The growing debt and budget deficit are the country's primary concerns. A 2017 study by the Organisation for Economic Co-operation and Development warned that reducing the foreign debt must be a very high priority for the government. Other fiscal reforms were also recommended to moderate the budget deficit.

Many foreign companies (manufacturing and services) operate in Costa Rica's Free Trade Zones (FTZ) where they benefit from investment and tax incentives. Well over half of that type of investment has come from the U.S. According to the government, the zones supported over 82,000 direct jobs and 43,000 indirect jobs in 2015. Companies with facilities in the America Free Zone in Heredia, for example, include Intel, Dell, HP, Bayer, Bosch, DHL, IBM and Okay Industries.

Of the GDP, 5.5% is generated by agriculture, 18.6% by industry and 75.9% by services. (2016) Agriculture employs 12.9% of the labor force, industry 18.57%, services 69.02% (2016) For the region, its unemployment level is moderately high (8.2% in 2016, according to the IMF). Although 20.5% of the population lives below the poverty line (2017), Costa Rica has one of the highest standards of living in Central America.

High-quality health care is provided by the government at a low cost to the users. Housing is also very affordable. Costa Rica is recognized in Latin America for the quality of its educational system. Because of its educational system, Costa Rica has one of the highest literacy rates in Latin America, 97%. General Basic Education is mandatory and provided without cost to the user. A US government report confirms that the country has "historically placed a high priority on education and the creation of a skilled workforce" but notes that the high school drop-out rate is increasing. As well, Costa Rica would benefit from more courses in languages such as English, Portuguese, Mandarin, and French and also in Science, Technology, Engineering, and Math (STEM).

Trade and foreign investment 

Costa Rica has free trade agreements with many countries, including the US. There are no significant trade barriers that would affect imports and the country has been lowering its tariffs by other Central American countries. The country's Free Trade Zones provide incentives for manufacturing and service industries to operate in Costa Rica. In 2015, the zones supported over 82 thousand direct jobs and 43 thousand indirect jobs in 2015 and average wages in the FTZ were 1.8 times greater than the average for private enterprise work in the rest of the country. In 2016, Amazon.com for example, had some 3,500 employees in Costa Rica and planned to increase that by 1,500 in 2017, making it an important employer.

The central location provides access to American markets and direct ocean access to Europe and Asia. The most important exports in 2015 (in order of dollar value) were medical instruments, bananas, tropical fruits, integrated circuits and orthopedic appliances. Total imports in that year were US$15 billion. The most significant products imported in 2015 (in order of dollar value) were refined petroleum, automobiles, packaged medications, broadcasting equipment, and computers. The total exports were US$12.6 billion for a trade deficit of US$2.39 billion in 2015.

Pharmaceuticals, financial outsourcing, software development, and ecotourism have become the prime industries in Costa Rica's economy. High levels of education among its residents make the country an attractive investing location. Since 1999, tourism earns more foreign exchange than the combined exports of the country's three main cash crops: bananas and pineapples especially, but also other crops, including coffee. Coffee production played a key role in Costa Rica's history and in 2006, was the third cash crop export. As a small country, Costa Rica now provides under 1% of the world's coffee production. In 2015, the value of coffee exports was US$305.9 million, a small part of the total agricultural exports of US$2.7 billion. Coffee production increased by 13.7% percent in 2015–16, declined by 17.5% in 2016–17, but was expected to increase by about 15% in the subsequent year.

Costa Rica has developed a system of payments for environmental services. Similarly, Costa Rica has a tax on water pollution to penalize businesses and homeowners that dump sewage, agricultural chemicals, and other pollutants into waterways. In May 2007, the Costa Rican government announced its intentions to become 100% carbon neutral by 2021. By 2015, 93 percent of the country's electricity came from renewable sources. In 2019, the country produced 99.62% of its electricity from renewable sources and ran completely on renewable sources for 300 continuous days.

In 1996, the Forest Law was enacted to provide direct financial incentives to landowners for the provision of environmental services. This helped reorient the forestry sector away from commercial timber production and the resulting deforestation and helped create awareness of the services it provides for the economy and society (i.e., carbon fixation, hydrological services such as producing fresh drinking water, biodiversity protection, and provision of scenic beauty).

A 2016 report by the U.S. government report identifies other challenges facing Costa Rica as it works to expand its economy by working with companies from the US (and probably from other countries). The major concerns identified were as follows:

 The ports, roads, railways, and water delivery systems would benefit from major upgrading, a concern voiced by other reports too. Attempts by China to invest in upgrading such aspects were "stalled by bureaucratic and legal concerns".
 The bureaucracy is "often slow and cumbersome".

Tourism 

Costa Rica is the most-visited nation in the Central American region, with 2.9 million foreign visitors in 2016, up 10% from 2015. In 2015, the tourism sector was responsible for 5.8% of the country's GDP, or $3.4 billion. In 2016, the highest number of tourists came from the United States, with 1,000,000 visitors, followed by Europe with 434,884 arrivals. According to Costa Rica Vacations, once tourists arrive in the country, 22% go to Tamarindo, 18% go to Arenal, 17% pass through Liberia (where the Daniel Oduber Quirós International Airport is located), 16% go to San José, the country's capital (passing through Juan Santamaría International Airport), while 18% choose Manuel Antonio and 7% Monteverde.

By 2004, tourism was generating more revenue and foreign exchange than bananas and coffee combined. In 2016, the World Travel & Tourism Council's estimates indicated a direct contribution to the GDP of 5.1% and 110,000 direct jobs in Costa Rica; the total number of jobs indirectly supported by tourism was 271,000.

A pioneer of ecotourism, Costa Rica draws many tourists to its extensive series of national parks and other protected areas. The trail Camino de Costa Rica supports this by allowing travelers to walk across the country from the Atlantic to the Pacific coast. In the 2011 Travel and Tourism Competitiveness Index, Costa Rica ranked 44th in the world and second among Latin American countries after Mexico in 2011. By the time of the 2017 report, the country had reached 38th place, slightly behind Panama. The Ethical Traveler group's ten countries on their 2017 list of The World's Ten Best Ethical Destinations includes Costa Rica. The country scored highest in environmental protection among the winners. Costa Rica began reversing deforestation in the 1990s, and they are moving towards using only renewable energy.

Government and politics

Administrative divisions 

Costa Rica is composed of seven provinces, which in turn are divided into 82 cantons (plural ), each of which is directed by a mayor. Mayors are chosen democratically every four years by each canton. There are no provincial legislatures. The cantons are further divided into 488 districts.

Foreign relations 

Costa Rica is an active member of the United Nations and the Organization of American States. The Inter-American Court of Human Rights and the United Nations University of Peace are based in Costa Rica. It is also a member of many other international organizations related to human rights and democracy, such as the Community of Democracies. The main foreign policy objective of Costa Rica is to foster human rights and sustainable development as a way to secure stability and growth.

Costa Rica is a member of the International Criminal Court, without a Bilateral Immunity Agreement of protection for the United States military (as covered under Article 98). Costa Rica is an observer of the Organisation internationale de la Francophonie.

On 10 September 1961, some months after Fidel Castro declared Cuba a socialist state, Costa Rican President Mario Echandi ended diplomatic relations with Cuba through Executive Decree Number 2. This freeze lasted 47 years until President Óscar Arias Sánchez re-established normal relations on 18 March 2009, saying, "If we have been able to turn the page with regimes as profoundly different to our reality as occurred with the USSR or, more recently, with the Republic of China, how would we not do it with a country that is geographically and culturally much nearer to Costa Rica?" Arias announced that both countries would exchange ambassadors.

Costa Rica has a long-term disagreement with Nicaragua over the San Juan River, which defines the border between the two countries, and Costa Rica's rights of navigation on the river. In 2010, there was also a dispute around Isla Calero, and the impact of Nicaraguan dredging of the river in that area.

On 14 July 2009, the International Court of Justice in the Hague upheld Costa Rica's navigation rights for commercial purposes to subsistence fishing on their side of the river. An 1858 treaty extended navigation rights to Costa Rica, but Nicaragua denied passenger travel and fishing were part of the deal; the court ruled Costa Ricans on the river were not required to have Nicaraguan tourist cards or visas as Nicaragua argued, but, in a nod to the Nicaraguans, ruled that Costa Rican boats and passengers must stop at the first and last Nicaraguan port along their route. They must also have an identity document or passport. Nicaragua can also impose timetables on Costa Rican traffic. Nicaragua may require Costa Rican boats to display the flag of Nicaragua but may not charge them for departure clearance from its ports. These were all specific items of contention brought to the court in the 2005 filing.

On 1 June 2007, Costa Rica broke diplomatic ties with Taiwan, switching recognition to the People's Republic of China. Costa Rica was the first of the Central American nations to do so. President Óscar Arias Sánchez admitted the action was a response to economic exigency. In response, the PRC built a new, $100 million, state-of-the-art football stadium in Parque la Sabana, in the province of San José. Approximately 600 Chinese engineers and laborers took part in this project, and it was inaugurated in March 2011, with a match between the national teams of Costa Rica and China.

Costa Rica finished a term on the United Nations Security Council, having been elected for a nonrenewable, two-year term in the 2007 election. Its term expired on 31 December 2009; this was Costa Rica's third time on the Security Council. Elayne Whyte Gómez is the Permanent Representative of Costa Rica to the UN Office at Geneva (2017) and President of the United Nations Conference to Negotiate a Legally Binding Instrument to Prohibit Nuclear Weapons.

Pacifism 
On 1 December 1948, Costa Rica abolished its military force. In 1949, the abolition of the military was introduced in Article 12 of the Costa Rican Constitution. The budget previously dedicated to the military is now dedicated to providing health care services and education. According to Deutsche Welle, "Costa Rica is known for its stable democracy, progressive social policies, such as free, compulsory public education, high social well-being, and emphasis on environmental protection." For law enforcement, Costa Rica has the Public Force of Costa Rica police agency.

In 2017, Costa Rica signed the UN treaty on the Prohibition of Nuclear Weapons.

Environmentalism 
In 2021 Costa Rica with Denmark launched the "Beyond Oil and Gas alliance" (BOGA) for stopping the use of fossil fuels. The BOGA campaign was presented in the COP26 Climate Summit, where Sweden joined as a core member, while New Zealand and Portugal joined as associate members.

Demographics 

The 2011 census counted a population of 4.3 million people distributed among the following groups: 83.6% whites or mestizos, 6.7% mulattoes, 2.4% Native American, 1.1% black or Afro-Caribbean; the census showed 1.1% as Other, 2.9% (141,304 people) as None, and 2.2% (107,196 people) as unspecified. By 2016, the UN estimation for the population was around  million.

In 2011, there were over 104,000 Native American or indigenous inhabitants, representing 2.4% of the population.

The population includes European Costa Ricans (of European ancestry), primarily of Spanish descent, with significant numbers of Italian, German, English, Dutch, French, Irish, Portuguese, and Polish families, as well a sizable Jewish community. The majority of the Afro-Costa Ricans are Creole English-speaking descendants of 19th century black Jamaican immigrant workers.

The 2011 census classified 83.6% of the population as white or Mestizo; the latter are persons of combined European and Amerindian descent. The Mulatto segment (mix of white and black) represented 6.7% and indigenous people made up 2.4% of the population. Native and European mixed-blood populations are far less than in other Latin American countries. Exceptions are Guanacaste, where almost half the population is visibly mestizo, a legacy of the more pervasive unions between Spanish colonists and Chorotega Amerindians through several generations, and Limón, where the vast majority of the Afro-Costa Rican community lives.

Costa Rica hosts many refugees, mainly from Colombia and Nicaragua. As a result of that and illegal immigration, an estimated 10–15% (400,000–600,000) of the Costa Rican population is made up of Nicaraguans. Some Nicaraguans migrate for seasonal work opportunities and then return to their country. Costa Rica took in many refugees from a range of other Latin American countries fleeing civil wars and dictatorships during the 1970s and 1980s, notably from Chile and Argentina, as well as people from El Salvador who fled from guerrillas and government death squads.

According to the World Bank, in 2010 about 489,200 immigrants lived in the country, many from Nicaragua, Panama, El Salvador, Honduras, Guatemala, and Belize, while 125,306 Costa Ricans live abroad in the United States, Panama, Nicaragua, Spain, Mexico, Canada, Germany, Venezuela, Dominican Republic, and Ecuador. The number of migrants declined in later years but in 2015, there were some 420,000 immigrants in Costa Rica and the number of asylum seekers (mostly from Honduras, El Salvador, Guatemala and Nicaragua) rose to more than 110,000, a fivefold increase from 2012. In 2016, the country was called a "magnet" for migrants from South and Central America and other countries who were hoping to reach the U.S.

Largest cities

Religion 

Most Costa Ricans identify with a Christian religion, with Catholicism being the one with the largest number of members and also the official state religion according to the 1949 Constitution, which at the same time guarantees freedom of religion. Costa Rica is the only modern state in the Americas which currently has Catholicism as its state religion; other countries with state religions (Catholic, Lutheran, Anglican, Orthodox) are in Europe: Liechtenstein, Monaco, the Vatican City, Malta, Norway, United Kingdom, Denmark, Iceland, and Greece.

The Latinobarómetro survey of 2017 found that 57% of the population identify themselves as Roman Catholics, 25% are Evangelical Protestants, 15% report that they do not have a religion, and 2% declare that they belong to another religion. This survey indicated a decline in the share of Catholics and rise in the share of Protestants and irreligious. A University of Costa Rica survey of 2018 show similar rates; 52% Catholics, 22% Protestants, 17% irreligious and 3% other. The rate of secularism is high by Latin American standards.

Due to small, but continuous, immigration from Asia and the Middle East, other religions have grown, the most popular being Buddhism, with about 100,000 practitioners (over 2% of the population). Most Buddhists are members of the Han Chinese community of about 40,000 with some new local converts. There is also a small Muslim community of about 500 families, or 0.001% of the population.

The Sinagoga Shaarei Zion synagogue is near La Sabana Metropolitan Park in San José. Several homes in the neighborhood east of the park display the Star of David and other Jewish symbols.

The Church of Jesus Christ of Latter-day Saints claims more than 35,000 members, and has a temple in San José that served as a regional worship center for Costa Rica. However, they represent less than 1% of the population.

Languages 

The primary language spoken in Costa Rica is Spanish, which features characteristics distinct to the country, a form of Central American Spanish. Costa Rica is a linguistically diverse country and home to at least five living local indigenous languages spoken by the descendants of pre-Columbian peoples: Maléku, Cabécar, Bribri, Guaymí, and Buglere.

Of native languages still spoken, primarily in indigenous reservations, the most numerically important are the Bribri, Maléku, Cabécar and Ngäbere languages; some of these have several thousand speakers in Costa Rica while others have a few hundred. Some languages, such as Teribe and Boruca, have fewer than a thousand speakers. The Buglere language and the closely related Guaymí are spoken by some in southeast Puntarenas.

A Creole-English language, Jamaican patois (also known as Mekatelyu), is an English-based Creole language spoken by the Afro-Carib immigrants who have settled primarily in Limón Province along the Caribbean coast.

About 10.7% of Costa Rica's adult population (18 or older) also speaks English, 0.7% French, and 0.3% speaks Portuguese or German as a second language.

Culture 

Costa Rica was the point where the Mesoamerican and South American native cultures met. The northwest of the country, the Nicoya peninsula, was the southernmost point of Nahuatl cultural influence when the Spanish conquerors (conquistadores) came in the 16th century. The central and southern portions of the country had Chibcha influences. The Atlantic coast, meanwhile, was populated with African workers during the 17th and 18th centuries.

As a result of the immigration of Spaniards, their 16th-century Spanish culture and its evolution marked everyday life and culture until today, with the Spanish language and the Catholic religion as primary influences.

The Department of Culture, Youth, and Sports is in charge of the promotion and coordination of cultural life. The work of the department is divided into Direction of Culture, Visual Arts, Scenic Arts, Music, Patrimony, and the System of Libraries. Permanent programs, such as the National Symphony Orchestra of Costa Rica and the Youth Symphony Orchestra, are conjunctions of two areas of work: Culture and Youth.

Dance-oriented genres, such as soca, salsa, bachata, merengue, cumbia and Costa Rican swing are enjoyed increasingly by older rather than younger people. The guitar is popular, especially as an accompaniment to folk dances; however, the marimba was made the national instrument.

In November 2017, National Geographic magazine named Costa Rica as the happiest country in the world, and the country routinely ranks high in various happiness metrics. The article included this summary: "Costa Ricans enjoy the pleasure of living daily life to the fullest in a place that mitigates stress and maximizes joy". It is not surprising then that one of the most recognizable phrases among "Ticos" is "Pura Vida", pure life in a literal translation. It reflects the inhabitant's philosophy of life, denoting a simple life, free of stress, a positive, relaxed feeling. The expression is used in various contexts in conversation. Often, people walking down the streets, or buying food at shops say hello by saying Pura Vida. It can be phrased as a question or as an acknowledgement of one's presence. A recommended response to "How are you?" would be "Pura Vida." In that usage, it might be translated as "awesome", indicating that all is very well. When used as a question, the connotation would be "everything is going well?" or "how are you?".

Costa Rica rates 12th on the 2017 Happy Planet Index in the World Happiness Report by the UN but the country is said to be the happiest in Latin America. Reasons include the high level of social services, the caring nature of its inhabitants, long life expectancy and relatively low corruption.

Cuisine 

Costa Rican cuisine is a blend of Native American, Spanish, African, and many other cuisine origins. Dishes such as the very traditional tamale and many others made of corn are the most representative of its indigenous inhabitants, and similar to other neighboring Mesoamerican countries. Spaniards brought many new ingredients to the country from other lands, especially spices and domestic animals. And later in the 19th century, the African flavor lent its presence with influence from other Caribbean mixed flavors. This is how Costa Rican cuisine today is very varied, with every new ethnic group who had recently become part of the country's population influencing the country's cuisine.

Sports 

Costa Rica entered the Summer Olympics for the first time in 1936. The sisters Silvia and Claudia Poll have won all four of the country's Olympic Medals for swimming; one Gold, one Silver, and two Bronze.

Football is the most popular sport in Costa Rica. The national team has played in five FIFA World Cup tournaments and reached the quarter-finals for the first time in 2014. Its best performance in the regional CONCACAF Gold Cup was runner-up in 2002. Paulo Wanchope, a forward who played for three clubs in England's Premier League in the late 1990s and early 2000s, is credited with enhancing foreign recognition of Costa Rican football. Costa Rica, along with Panama, was granted the hosting rights of 2020 FIFA U-20 Women's World Cup, which was postponed until 2021, due to the COVID-19 pandemic. On 17 November 2020, FIFA announced that the event would be held in Costa Rica in 2022.

As of late 2021, Costa Rica's women's national volleyball team has been the top team in Central America's AFECAVOL (Asociación de Federaciones CentroAmericanas de Voleibol) zone. Costa Rica featured a women's national team in beach volleyball that competed at the 2018–2020 NORCECA Beach Volleyball Continental Cup.

Education 

The literacy rate in Costa Rica is approximately 97 percent and English is widely spoken primarily due to Costa Rica's tourism industry. When the army was abolished in 1949, it was said that the "army would be replaced with an army of teachers". Universal public education is guaranteed in the constitution; primary education is obligatory, and both preschool and secondary school are free. Students who finish 11th grade receive a Costa Rican Bachillerato Diploma accredited by the Costa Rican Ministry of Education.

There are both state and private universities. The state-funded University of Costa Rica has been awarded the title "Meritorious Institution of Costa Rican Education and Culture" and hosts around 25,000 students who study at numerous campuses established around the country.

A 2016 report by the U.S. government report identifies the current challenges facing the education system, including the high dropout rate among secondary school students. The country needs even more workers who are fluent in English and languages such as Portuguese, Mandarin and French. It would also benefit from more graduates in science, technology, engineering and mathematics (STEM) programs, according to the report. Costa Rica was ranked 56th in the Global Innovation Index in 2021, down from 55th in 2019.

Health 

According to the UNDP, in 2010 the life expectancy at birth for Costa Ricans was 79.3 years. The Nicoya Peninsula is considered one of the Blue Zones in the world, where people commonly live active lives past the age of 100 years. The New Economics Foundation (NEF) ranked Costa Rica first in its 2009 Happy Planet Index, and once again in 2012. The index measures the health and happiness they produce per unit of environmental input. According to NEF, Costa Rica's lead is due to its very high life expectancy which is second highest in the Americas, and higher than the United States. The country also experienced well-being higher than many richer nations and a per capita ecological footprint one-third the size of the United States.

In 2002, there were 0.58 new general practitioner (medical) consultations and 0.33 new specialist consultations per capita, and a hospital admission rate of 8.1%. Preventive health care is also successful. In 2002, 96% of Costa Rican women used some form of contraception, and antenatal care services were provided to 87% of all pregnant women. All children under one have access to well-baby clinics, and the immunization coverage rate in 2020 was above 95% for all antigens. Costa Rica has a very low malaria incidence of 48 per 100,000 in 2000 and no reported cases of measles in 2002. The perinatal mortality rate dropped from 12.0 per 1000 in 1972 to 5.4 per 1000 in 2001.

Costa Rica has been cited as Central America's great health success story. Its healthcare system is ranked higher than that of the United States, despite having a fraction of its GDP. Prior to 1940, government hospitals and charities provided most health care. But since the 1941 creation of the Social Insurance Administration (Caja Costarricense de Seguro Social – CCSS), Costa Rica has provided universal health care to its wage-earning residents, with coverage extended to dependants over time. In 1973, the CCSS took over administration of all 29 of the country's public hospitals and all health care, also launching a Rural Health Program (Programa de Salud Rural) for primary care to rural areas, later extended to primary care services nationwide. In 1993, laws were passed to enable elected health boards that represented health consumers, social insurance representatives, employers, and social organizations. By 2000, social health insurance coverage was available to 82% of the Costa Rican population. Each health committee manages an area equivalent to one of the 83 administrative cantons of Costa Rica. There is limited use of private, for-profit services (around 14.4% of the national total health expenditure). About 7% of GDP is allocated to the health sector, and over 70% is government-funded.

Primary health care facilities in Costa Rica include health clinics, with a general practitioner, nurse, clerk, pharmacist, and a primary health technician. In 2008, there were five specialty national hospitals, three general national hospitals, seven regional hospitals, 13 peripheral hospitals, and 10 major clinics serving as referral centers for primary care clinics, which also deliver biopsychosocial services, family and community medical services, and promotion and prevention programs. Patients can choose private health care to avoid waiting lists.

Costa Rica is among the Latin America countries that have become popular destinations for medical tourism. In 2006, Costa Rica received 150,000 foreigners that came for medical treatment. Costa Rica is particularly attractive to Americans due to geographic proximity, high quality of medical services, and lower medical costs.

See also 

 Index of Costa Rica-related articles
 Outline of Costa Rica
 Camino de Costa Rica (trail across the country from the Atlantic to the Pacific coast)

Notes

References

Further reading 
 Blake, Beatrice. The New Key to Costa Rica (Berkeley: Ulysses Press, 2009).
 Chase, Cida S. "Costa Rican Americans". Gale Encyclopedia of Multicultural America, edited by Thomas Riggs, (3rd ed., vol. 1, Gale, 2014), pp. 543–551. online
 Edelman, Marc. Peasants Against Globalization: Rural Social Movements in Costa Rica. Stanford: Stanford University Press, 1999.
 
 Huhn, Sebastian: Contested Cornerstones of Nonviolent National Self-Perception in Costa Rica: A Historical Approach, 2009.
 Keller, Marius; Niestroy, Ingeborg; García Schmidt, Armando; Esche, Andreas. "Costa Rica: Pioneering Sustainability". Excerpt (pp. 81–102) from Bertelsmann Stiftung (ed.). Winning Strategies for a Sustainable Future. Gütersloh, Germany: Verlag Bertelsmann Stiftung, 2013.
 Lara, Sylvia Lara, Tom Barry, and Peter Simonson. Inside Costa Rica: The Essential Guide to Its Politics, Economy, Society and Environment. London: Latin America Bureau, 1995.
 Lehoucq, Fabrice E. and Ivan Molina. Stuffing the Ballot Box: Fraud, Electoral Reform, and Democratization in Costa Rica. Cambridge: Cambridge University Press, 2002.
 Lehoucq, Fabrice E. Policymaking, Parties, and Institutions in Democratic Costa Rica, 2006.
 Longley, Kyle. Sparrow and the Hawk: Costa Rica and the United States during the Rise of José Figueres. (University of Alabama Press, 1997).
 Mount, Graeme S. "Costa Rica and the Cold War, 1948–1990". Canadian Journal of History 50.2 (2015): 290–316.
 Palmer, Steven and Iván Molina. The Costa Rica Reader: History, Culture, Politics. Durham and London: Duke University Press, 2004.
 Sandoval, Carlos. Threatening Others: Nicaraguans and the Formation of National Identities in Costa Rica. Athens: Ohio University Press, 2004.
 Wilson, Bruce M. Costa Rica: Politics, Economics, and Democracy: Politics, Economics, and Democracy. Boulder, London: Lynne Rienner Publishers, 1998.

External links 

 Costa Rica. The World Factbook. Central Intelligence Agency.
 Costa Rica at UCB Libraries GovPubs
 
 
Street Art of San Jose by danscape 
Costa Rica profile from the BBC News

 Key Development Forecasts for Costa Rica from International Futures
 Government and administration
 Official website of the government of Costa Rica 
Trade
 World Bank Summary Trade Statistics Costa Rica

 
Countries in Central America
Former Spanish colonies
Republics
Spanish-speaking countries and territories
States and territories established in 1821
Member states of the United Nations
1821 establishments in North America
Countries in North America
Christian states
OECD members